The yellow-bibbed fruit dove (Ptilinopus solomonensis) is a species of bird in the family Columbidae. It is found in the Bismarck and Solomon Islands archipelagos. The Geelvink fruit dove (P. speciosus) was formerly considered conspecific, but was split as a distinct species by the IOC in 2021.

Its natural habitat is subtropical or tropical moist lowland forests.

References

yellow-bibbed fruit dove
Birds of the Bismarck Archipelago
Birds of the Solomon Islands
yellow-bibbed fruit dove
yellow-bibbed fruit dove
Taxonomy articles created by Polbot